Myxas is a genus of small air-breathing freshwater snails, aquatic gastropod mollusks in the family Lymnaeidae, the pond snails.

Distribution
This genus is European.

Species
Species within this genus include:
 Myxas glutinosa (O. F. Müller, 1774) - type species

References

Lymnaeidae
Taxa named by George Brettingham Sowerby I